Youth Theatre is a theatre in Novi Sad, the capital of Vojvodina in Serbia. Youth Theatre has two stages: the children's stage and the evening stage. Its ensemble consists of sixteen permanent characters.

History
The Puppet Theatre, held in September 1931, was the first play performed in Youth Theatre. Over the next few years, a steady turnover of puppeteers continually renewed the group. As their reputation grew, they began to work with resources of better quality. The company played not only on the main stage in Novi Sad, but also often toured around the province of Vojvodina. Plays were performed on Sundays, the only day the audience was unoccupied and able to attend. Tickets were very cheap, and the group often offered performances free of charge.

Youth Theatre was closed during World War II. Afterwards, it reopened under the new name of "Vojvodinian Puppet Theatre". Unfortunately, circumstances were difficult because of the large number of puppets and equipment which were lost or stolen during the war. However, the manager of the Serbian National Theatre, then called the Vojvodinian National Theatre, provided his support to help revive the company.

Soon after, the theatre changed its name to "City Puppet Theatre". From 1952 to 1968, it was simply called the "Puppet Theatre". In November 1968, its name changed again, this time to Youth Theatre, which has remained since that time.

See also
 Serbian National Theatre
 Novi Sad Theatre
 List of theatres in Serbia

External links
 www.pozoristemladih.co.rs - Official site 

1931 establishments in Serbia
Theatres in Novi Sad
Culture in Novi Sad
Youth theatre companies